Mecerreyes is a village and municipality in the province of Burgos in Spain, part of the autonomous community of Castile-Leon.

It has 312 inhabitants, and it is near Covarrubias.

Politics
The mayor is Julián Vicario Alonso, of the Partido Popular.

References

External links
Mecerreyes
Parroquia de San Martín Obispo (Mecerreyes)

Municipalities in the Province of Burgos